Moisés Omar Halleslevens Acevedo (born 4 September 1949) is the former Vice President of Nicaragua, serving during the third term of President Daniel Ortega.

Biography
Halleslevens was born in La Libertad, Chontales. In 1974, he joined the "Juan José Quezada" guerrilla column, which attacked the house of the Minister of Agriculture under the regime of Anastasio Somoza Debayle and negotiated for the freedom of various political prisoners, including Ortega. During the 1980s, Halleslevens was chief of the Army Political Directorate and, later, Military Counterintelligence. In the aftermath of Hurricane Joan in 1988, he led the evacuation of El Rama.

Halleslevens served as Commander in Chief of the Nicaraguan Armed Forces from 2005 until his retirement from military life in 2010. In 2011, the Sandinista National Liberation Front nominated Halleslevens as Ortega's running mate. Ortega was reelected that year, and Halleslevens took office, replacing Jaime Morales Carazo.

His maternal origins are originally from the Flemish city of Antwerp, Belgium (Halleslevens) and his paternal origins are from Faro, Algarve, Portugal (Acevedo).

References

1949 births
Living people
People from Chontales Department
Sandinista National Liberation Front politicians
Vice presidents of Nicaragua
People of the Nicaraguan Revolution
Nicaraguan people of Belgian descent
Nicaraguan people of Portuguese descent